Longhurst Lodge is a Grade II listed building in Cranleigh, Surrey, England. It is located on the former Baynards Park estate, about a quarter of a mile northwest of where the country house stood. It became a listed building in 1987.

The property, a Victorian gate lodge, is located at one of the gated entrances to the estate. It is one of four such lodges on the estate, commissioned by the Reverend Thomas Thurlow around 1837, after he purchased the estate.

After being left to dereliction for the 48 years since it was previously occupied — by Irene Gould, her husband and three sons, between 1955 and 1961 — two Cranleigh residents, Vanessa Ford-Robbins and Nik Huddy, purchased the property in 2009 for £250,000 with a view to making it their home. The renovation was followed from April 2011 (about six months into the project) in the Channel 4 show The Restoration Man. Upon completion, it was the first time the building had gas, hot water and electricity in it.

The new owners won the Special Heritage Award at the 2013 Waverley Design Awards.

Structure and layout

Exterior
The building has a Roman cement render with a steeply pitched plain tiled roof. It is a cruciform plan with triple diagonal stacks on a ridge plinth at the crossing of the two ranges. The upper storey and attic is under a gabled dormer. Friezes of grapes and foliage bands in cement are found around the eaves and across the ground floor. Animals, some heraldic, decorate the walls. Two square bay windows are on the left hand (eastern) return front. A gabled porch with architrave surround and four-centred arch over the door in the gable end. A pentice extension is across the right hand (western) return front.

The western side of the building backs onto a bridle path.

Interior
The building is two storeys. The post-restoration layout has a kitchen immediately inside the front door on the home's northern side. A utility room is on the western side of the house, off the kitchen.

The aforementioned chimney services fireplaces in the kitchen, in the living/dining room at the southern end of the ground floor, and in one of the two bedrooms that make up the first floor.

As of Restoration Mans final visit of the original broadcast, there was no bathroom. It was due to be included in the building's extension.

Gallery

References

External links

Photographs
The gate lodge in 1980 - Flickr.com
During the restoration, in 2011 - Geograph.co.uk
A view of the northern façade in 2016 - Instagram, 21 May 2016
The eastern side of the building in 2019, post-renovation - Geograph.co.uk
The gates in 2019 - Geograph.co.uk

Cranleigh
Houses in Surrey
Gatehouses (architecture)
Grade II listed buildings in Surrey